Thomas Monier is a French slalom canoeist who competed from the late 1980s to the early 2000s. He won a silver medal in the K-1 team event at the 2002 ICF Canoe Slalom World Championships in Bourg St.-Maurice.

References

French male canoeists
Living people
Year of birth missing (living people)
Medalists at the ICF Canoe Slalom World Championships